St. Joseph High School was a Catholic high school located in Kenosha, Wisconsin. It served students in grades 9 through 12. On July 1, 2010, it was merged along with St. Mark Elementary School and St. Joseph Interparish Jr. High into St. Joseph Catholic Academy.

History
Founded in 1958 by the School Sisters of the Third Order of St Francis and the Catholic parishes of Kenosha, St. Joseph High School opened its doors in September 1958 to 460 freshmen and sophomores. In 1959 the school admitted students in grades 11 and 12. Enrollment soared to 1,600 by 1965 but subsequently began to fall. The School Sisters of the Third Order of St Francis transferred ownership of the school to the Archdiocese of Milwaukee in 1991, celebrated officially with a Mass in September 1991 presided over by Archbishop Rembert Weakland. Catholic parishes in Kenosha and Pleasant Prairie continue to sponsor the school.

In 2010, St. Joseph High School was combined with St. Mark the Evangelist Elementary School and St. Joseph Interparish Junior High School to form the St. Joseph Catholic Academy.

Notable alumni
 Jarvis Brown, Major League Baseball outfielder
 Laura Kaeppeler, Miss America 2012
 Tom Regner, football player for the Houston Oilers
 Jim Rygiel, three-time Oscar winner for visual effects, Lord of the Rings series
 Nick Van Exel, former NBA star

References

External links
 

Roman Catholic Archdiocese of Milwaukee
Saint Joseph High School, Kenosha
Saint Joseph High School, Kenosha
Saint Joseph High School, Kenosha
Saint Joseph High School, Kenosha
1958 establishments in Wisconsin
2010 disestablishments in Wisconsin